The 2019 NCAA Division I Women's Lacrosse Championship is the 38th annual single-elimination tournament to determine the national champion of Division I NCAA women's college lacrosse. The semifinal and championship rounds will be played at Homewood Field in Baltimore from May 24–26, 2019. All other rounds will be played at campus sites, usually at the home field of the higher-seeded team, from May 7–19.

Tournament field
All NCAA Division I women's lacrosse programs were eligible for this championship, and a total of 28 teams were invited to participate. 15 teams qualified automatically by winning their conference tournaments while the remaining 13 teams qualified at-large based on their regular season records.

Seeds

1. Maryland (18-1)
2. Boston College (19-1)
3. North Carolina (15-3)
4. Northwestern (14-4)
5. Syracuse (15-4)
6. Virginia (12-6)
7. Princeton (14-3)
8. Michigan (15-3)

Teams

Bracket

Play-in games

Tournament bracket
Games on Conference Sports Networks (BTN & BTN+) or ESPN3 for First & Second Rounds. Semifinals on ESPNews & Finals on ESPNU

*First and second round host.

See also 
 NCAA Division II Women's Lacrosse Championship 
 NCAA Division III Women's Lacrosse Championship
 NCAA Division I Men's Lacrosse Championship

References

NCAA Division I Women's Lacrosse Championship
NCAA Women's Lacrosse Championship
Lacrosse
NCAA Division I Women's Lacrosse
NCAA